Caopu station is a station on Line 3 of the Shenzhen Metro. It opened on 28 December 2010. This station served as the terminus of the line until the extension to Yitian on 28 June 2011.

Station layout

Exits

References

External links
 Shenzhen Metro Caopu Station (Chinese)
 Shenzhen Metro Caopu Station (English)

Shenzhen Metro stations
Railway stations in Guangdong
Longgang District, Shenzhen
Luohu District
Railway stations in China opened in 2010